Shane Monahan (born 28 April 1987) is an Irish professional rugby union player.

Monahan previous played for Leinster as an academy player and for Connacht in Ireland. He then played for the English side Rotherham Titans in the RFU Championship, where he became a stand out performer, scoring eleven tries in the 2011–12 season as they finished seventh in the table.

Monahan signed a one-year deal to join Aviva Premiership side Gloucester for the 2012–13 season. His first highlight was scoring four tries in the Amlin Challenge Cup victory over London Irish. On 2 April 2013, it was announced that Monahan had signed a two-year contract extension to keep him at Gloucester until the end of the 2014–15 season.

On 13 August 2015, it was announced that Irish Pro12 side Munster had signed Monahan on a short-term contract as cover during the 2015 Rugby World Cup. He made his debut for Munster on 5 September 2015, starting against Treviso. Monahan left Munster in November 2015, upon the conclusion of his contract.

References

External links
Gloucester Rugby Profile
Munster Profile

Living people
1987 births
People from Drogheda
Irish rugby union players
Leinster Rugby players
Connacht Rugby players
Rotherham Titans players
Gloucester Rugby players
Munster Rugby players
Irish expatriate rugby union players
Expatriate rugby union players in England
Irish expatriate sportspeople in England
Rugby union wings
Rugby union centres
Rugby union players from County Louth